Nea Everilda Morin (née Barnard) (21 May 1905 – 12 July 1986) was a British rock climber and mountain climber.

Morin climbed in the Alps in the 1920s, joined the Ladies Alpine Club, and met many climbers in the French . In 1928 she married Jean Morin (1897–1943) and lived in Paris.  She climbed often with other women and advocated the cordée féminine, climbing only with women on a rope.  After the death of her husband in World War II, she lived in Tunbridge Wells and climbed in England and Wales and was a member of the female-only Pinnacle Club.  In 1941 Morin had made the first ascent of Clogwyn Y Grochan the route, which is 230 feet high and graded very severe 4b, is named Nea. She also led on an ascent of Curving Crack on Clogwyn du'r Arddu (the Black Cliff). In 1959, she was the only woman in the team of six British climbers who attempted to make the first ascent of 6812 meter high Ama Dablam in Nepal.

Her autobiography, A Woman's Reach (1968), describes her climbing and the achievement of other women in the mountains.

References

British mountain climbers
British rock climbers
1905 births
1986 deaths
Female climbers